John Hershaw (1912-1966) from Ardeer, North Ayrshire was a Scottish international lawn bowler.

Bowls career
Hershaw competed in the first World Bowls Championship in Kyeemagh, New South Wales, Australia in 1966  and he won a silver medal in the singles at the championship. He also won a silver medal in the team event (Leonard Trophy).

He won the Scottish National Bowls Championships in 1965 and 1966 and subsequently won the singles at the British Isles Bowls Championships in 1966.

He collapsed at home and died on 17 November 1966, just two weeks after the 1966 World Championships and the Stevenston Town Council organised a trophy event called the Hershaw Memorial Trophy the following year.

References

1912 births
1966 deaths
Scottish male bowls players